Darryll John Pines is an American aerospace engineer and academic administrator currently serving as president of University of Maryland, College Park. He was previously dean of the A. James Clark School of Engineering and held the Glenn L. Martin professorship of aerospace engineering.

Early life and education 
Darryll John Pines was born in Oakland, California, on August 28, 1964. He completed a B.S. in Mechanical Engineering at University of California, Berkeley. Pines earned a M.S. (1988) and Ph.D. (1992) in Mechanical Engineering at Massachusetts Institute of Technology.

Career 
In 1995, Pines joined the faculty of University of Maryland, College Park (UMD), as an assistant professor. He served as dean of the A. James Clark School of Engineering and held the Glenn L. Martin professorship of aerospace engineering. Pines assumed the presidency on July 1, 2020, succeeding President Wallace Loh.

Awards and honors 
Pines was elected a member of the National Academy of Engineering in 2019 for inspirational leadership and contributions to engineering education excellence in the United States.

Personal life 
Pines' son Donovan Pines played for the Maryland Terrapins men's soccer team and is currently a professional soccer player on the roster of D.C. United.

References

External links

 

20th-century American educators
20th-century American engineers
21st-century American educators
21st-century American engineers
1964 births
African-American academic administrators
African-American engineers
American aerospace engineers
American mechanical engineers
Educators from California
Engineers from California
Fellows of the American Institute of Aeronautics and Astronautics
Fellows of the American Society of Mechanical Engineers
Fellows of the Institute of Physics
Living people
Members of the United States National Academy of Engineering
MIT School of Engineering alumni
People from Oakland, California
Presidents of the University of Maryland, College Park
UC Berkeley College of Engineering alumni
University of Maryland, College Park faculty